Two submarines of the United States Navy have been named USS Drum, after the fish known as drums.

  was a  nuclear submarine in service from 1972 to 1995.

United States Navy ship names